Hamed Namouchi (born 14 February 1984) is a former professional footballer who played as a midfielder. Born in France, he represented the Tunisia national team internationally.

Club career
Born in Cannes, France, Namouchi started his career with local club AS Cannes.

He signed for Rangers in September 2003 on a free transfer. He made his Rangers debut on 10 January 2004 against Hibernian as a substitute. On 1 January 2005, he scored a late equaliser to salvage a 1–1 draw away to Dundee United. At Rangers he picked up a Scottish Premier League winners' medal in 2005, and appeared in every game in their UEFA Champions League campaign where he was earmarked by Luís Figo as the player that "impressed him most".

Namouchi joined Lorient for a fee of £500,000 in August 2006 after being told by Rangers manager Paul Le Guen that he was surplus to requirements.

In late 2009, Namouchi agreed to a contract with the Turkish Süper Lig side Sivasspor after lengthy contract negotiations.

On 15 November 2009, he was invited to a trial at SC Freiburg. The following month, he signed with SC Freiburg for the remainder of the season.

In October 2010, he signed with French second-tier side Grenoble on a two-year deal.

In January 2012, he moved to Tunisia, signing a three and a half year contract with Étoile Sportive du Sahel.

In June 2014 he moved to Lokomotiv Plovdiv of the Bulgarian Premier League.

International career
Born in France, Namouchi played for the Tunisia national team. He won his 14th international cap against Belarus in May 2006, scoring his first international goal in the same game. He was also a member of Tunisia's qualification for the 2006 FIFA World Cup and featured in all of their three games at the tournament.

References

External links
 
 
 

1984 births
Living people
French sportspeople of Tunisian descent
Sportspeople from Cannes
Tunisian footballers
Association football midfielders
Tunisia international footballers
2005 FIFA Confederations Cup players
2006 FIFA World Cup players
AS Cannes players
Rangers F.C. players
FC Lorient players
SC Freiburg players
PFC Lokomotiv Plovdiv players
Scottish Premier League players
Ligue 1 players
Bundesliga players
First Professional Football League (Bulgaria) players
Tunisian expatriate sportspeople in Scotland
Expatriate footballers in Scotland
Tunisian expatriate sportspeople in France
Expatriate footballers in France
Tunisian expatriate sportspeople in Germany
Expatriate footballers in Germany
Tunisian expatriate sportspeople in Bulgaria
Expatriate footballers in Bulgaria
Footballers from Provence-Alpes-Côte d'Azur